Krasnyansky is a rural locality (a khutor) in Bolshinskoye Rural Settlement, Uryupinsky District, Volgograd Oblast, Russia. The population was 162 as of 2010. There are 3 streets.

Geography 
Krasnyansky is located in forest steppe, 21 km north of Uryupinsk (the district's administrative centre) by road. Nizhnekrasnyansky is the nearest rural locality.

References 

Rural localities in Uryupinsky District